Dieter Göthe is a retired East German slalom canoeist who competed from the mid-1950s to the early 1960s. He won four medals at the ICF Canoe Slalom World Championships with a gold (C-2 team: 1959), a silver (C-2 team: 1955) and two bronzes (C-2: 1959, C-2 team: 1957).

References

German male canoeists
Living people
Year of birth missing (living people)
Medalists at the ICF Canoe Slalom World Championships